Daniel Senn (born 17 September 1983) is a Swiss footballer who currently plays as defender for FC Tuggen.

External links
Football.ch profile

1983 births
Living people
Swiss men's footballers
Swiss Super League players
FC Winterthur players
FC St. Gallen players
FC Schaffhausen players
Association football midfielders